Bogatovka is a rural locality (a village) in Chernushinsky District, Perm Krai, Russia. The population was 2 as of 2010. There is 1 street.

Geography 
Bogatovka is located 35 km northeast of Chernushka (the district's administrative centre) by road. Korobeyniki is the nearest rural locality.

References 

Rural localities in Chernushinsky District